is a mountain in Ueno, Gunma Prefecture, Japan.

The plane crash of Japan Airlines Flight 123 was initially reported on Mount Osutaka, but later confirmed to be on a ridge near Mount Takamagahara. It was the deadliest single-plane accident in world history.

References

Osutaka